Aleksandr Arkadyevich Stasevich (born 14 October 1953) is a Soviet sprinter. He competed in the men's 200 metres at the 1980 Summer Olympics.

References

1953 births
Living people
Athletes (track and field) at the 1980 Summer Olympics
Soviet male sprinters
Olympic athletes of the Soviet Union
Place of birth missing (living people)